BNS Shongram is a Type 056 stealth surface warfare guided missile corvette of the Bangladesh Navy. She was built at Wuchang Shipyard of China. She is the third corvette of the class for the Bangladesh Navy.

Career
The Bangladesh Navy signed a contract with the China State Shipbuilding Corporation for second batch of two C-13B version of Type 056 corvettes on 21 July 2015. The ships were laid down at Wuchang Shipyard on 9 August 2016. BNS Shongram was launched on 12 February 2018 and handed over to the Bangladesh Navy on 28 March 2019. She began her delivery voyage from the port of Shanghai, China to Bangladesh on 12 April 2019, with stops at the Yantian port in China and the Port Klang in Malaysia, reaching BNS Issa Khan, Chattogram on 27 April 2019.  Shongram was commissioned into the Bangladesh Navy on 18 June 2020.

On 9 August 2020, she departed Chattogram for Lebanon under Captain Faisal Mohammad Arifur Rahman Bhuiyan to join UN peacekeeping operations, UNIFIL. On her way to Lebanon, she made a port call at Mormugao Port, India, on 17 August 2020. She took over from BNS Bijoy which had been damaged in the Beirut explosions. She joined UNIFIL in September 2020.

Design
With a displacement of 1,300 tonnes, she has a complement of 78 personnel including 60 sailors and 18 officers. She has two power stations, forward and rear, and electricity supply works with one of the power station sunk. Compared to the traditional round bilge boat, the ship is designed with V type, having angle bending line at the bottom so that she can sail with high speed in rough sea state. she will act mainly as a surface warfare corvette. BNS Shongram has a helicopter deck aft which can support a medium-size helicopter, but she has no hangar.

Electronics
The ship uses SMART-S MK2 S-band 3D AESA radar for surface and air search purposes. This radar can also be used for helicopter landing control and as a fire control radar.

Armaments
The ship carries one H/PJ-26 76 mm main gun placed forward. Two 2-cell C-802A anti-ship missiles are installed in the ship for anti surface operations. Two H/PJ-17 30 mm remote controlled gun turrets amidships. For air defence, she carries an eight-cell FL-3000N launcher, which is the Chinese equivalent of RAM. The ship also carries two 6-cell Type-87 240mm ASW rocket launchers.

See also
List of active ships of the Bangladesh Navy

References

Ships of the Bangladesh Navy
Type 056 corvettes of the Bangladesh Navy
2018 ships
Ships built in Wuhan